Lake Montezuma is a census-designated place (CDP) in Yavapai County in the U.S. state of Arizona. The population was 5,111 at the 2020 census. The CDP includes the communities of Rimrock and McGuireville.

History
The community was originally known as Beaver Creek as ranchers and farmers settled along the banks of the creek named for the prolific numbers of beavers found there.

Wales Arnold, the first settler along Beaver Creek, came to Beaver Creek in 1870 and lived at what became known as The Montezuma Well Ranch.  Arnold, who came to Arizona as a member of the California Column during the Civil War ultimately became the sutler or civilian merchant of the firm Arnold and Bowers at Camp Lincoln following his discharge from the Army at Fort Whipple August 29, 1864.  His partner in this enterprise was George Bowers who was killed by Indians near the head of Copper Canyon while en route to Prescott alongside a young soldier named Robert Nix. Arnold held several hay contracts with the Army at Camp Lincoln (renamed Fort Verde in 1868) and grew the first alfalfa known to be grown in the Verde Valley.  The Montezuma Well Ranch served as a way station where mail riders changed horses when the mail began to be carried from Fort Whipple to Fort Wingate.

By 1879 there were several children along Beaver Creek and what became Beaver Creek School started when Ed Mulholland began teaching school there then.

The part of the community known as McGuireville began in 1910 when Eugene McGuire settled near the confluence of Dry Beaver Creek and Wet Beaver Creek. This was also at the junction of the historic road from Stoneman Lake which split there with one route going on to Cornville, Cottonwood and Jerome and the other going south to Camp Verde and on to Prescott via Copper Canyon or Cherry. Eugene McGuire along with his son Gene homesteaded there beginning in 1910.  Their small store and gas station was supplanted by another store operated by Midge Montgomery who started Beaver Creek Store there in 1931.

The area generally became known as Rimrock in 1928 when Virginia Finnie, the daughter of a prominent local rancher, married Romaine Lowdermilk and the couple along with partner Russell Boardman started a dude ranch originally called Rimrock Lodge later known as Rimrock Dude Ranch. It was so named for the prominent limestone rimrocks forming the edges of the mesas visible from the hill top ranch.  Her prominent guests were wanting efficient communications with the outside world so Virginia saw the need to establish a post office on the ranch.  Virginia's  Mother-in-law, Ella Loudermilk, became the first post mistress of the newly established Rimrock Post Office chartered July 11, 1928.  People from the Coconino County line near Stoneman Lake, Apache Maid Ranch etc. and up and down the creek nearly to Camp Verde, picked up their mail at the Rimrock Post Office. The former area of Beaver Creek School district thus generally became known as Rimrock.  One of  Arizona's oldest continuously operated landing strips - The Rimrock Airport - is located here as dudes used to fly into the ranch in days gone by.

Around 1957 shortly after the Black Canyon Highway was built north from Phoenix, one of the largest ranches in Rimrock was turned into a subdivision called Lake Montezuma.  The developers were planning on selling much of the property to out-of-state buyers and realized they needed something attractive in the name.  They dug out a pond below the original ranch house and named it Lake Montezuma after the area's most significant local landmark - Montezuma Well National Monument.

The majority of the population of the rapidly growing area soon lived in this one subdivision and virtually all of them were not from the local area.  They would identify themselves as being from Lake Montezuma not realizing that they might also be considered a resident of Rimrock and also Beaver Creek.  Thus the confusion over the name of the general area.

In the area of the nearby Lawrence Crossing of the Wet Beaver Creek there are artifacts of the ancient Sinagua people, including water catchments for irrigation canals.

Geography
Lake Montezuma is located at  (34.640283, -111.783377).

Climate
The Köppen Climate Classification subtype for this climate is "Csa". (Mediterranean Climate).

Demographics

As of the census of 2000, there were 3,344 people, 1,471 households, and 938 families residing in the CDP. The racial makeup of the CDP was 92.6% White, 0.1% Black or African American, 2.3% Native American, 0.2% Asian, 2.8% from other races, and 2.0% from two or more races.  7.3% of the population were Hispanic or Latino of any race.

There were 1,471 households, out of which 20.6% had children under the age of 18 living with them, 51.7% were married couples living together, 8.5% had a female householder with no husband present, and 36.2% were non-families. 28.0% of all households were made up of individuals, and 11.9% had someone living alone who was 65 years of age or older.  The average household size was 2.27 and the average family size was 2.73.

In the CDP, the population was spread out, with 19.6% under the age of 18, 6.4% from 18 to 24, 24.5% from 25 to 44, 28.5% from 45 to 64, and 21.1% who were 65 years of age or older.  The median age was 45 years. For every 100 females, there were 92.7 males.  For every 100 females age 18 and over, there were 92.1 males.

The median income for a household in the CDP was $33,750, and the median income for a family was $36,864. Males had a median income of $22,365 versus $21,538 for females. The per capita income for the CDP was $17,043.  About 7.2% of families and 9.1% of the population were below the poverty line, including 12.4% of those under age 18 and 1.4% of those age 65 or over.

Notable person
 Eulalia "Sister" Bourne, pioneer Arizona schoolteacher and author, began her teaching career at Beaver Creek School circa 1910.

See also
Coconino National Forest
Montezuma Rimrock Fire District
Wet Beaver Wilderness

References

External links
Beaver Creek Community Association
Community Profile, from Arizona Department of Commerce
Lake Montezuma profile, at City-Data

Census-designated places in Yavapai County, Arizona
Arizona placenames of Native American origin